Arrested Development is an American television sitcom that originally aired on the Fox network from November 2, 2003 to February 10, 2006. It was later revived by Netflix for a fourth season (2013) and a fifth season (2018).

Created by Mitchell Hurwitz, the show centers on the Bluth family, a formerly wealthy, habitually dysfunctional family, and is presented in a continuous format, incorporating hand-held camera work, narration, archival photos, and historical footage.  

The series stars Will Arnett, Jason Bateman, Michael Cera, David Cross, Portia de Rossi, Tony Hale, Alia Shawkat, Jeffrey Tambor, and Jessica Walter. Ron Howard serves as an executive producer on the show, as well as its narrator.

Cast

Main, recurring, and guest cast of Arrested Development

References

External links 
 List of Arrested Development cast members at the Internet Movie Database

Cast
Arrested Development